The Peninsular Telephone Company Building, also known as the Peninsula Telephone Company Building or the GTE Building  is an historic three-story yellow brick building located at 1009 4th Avenue, West in Bradenton, Florida. Built in 1925 for Peninsular, an independent telephone operating company based in Tampa which later became part of General Telephone (GTE), it was designed by local architect J. H. Johnson in the Commercial or Chicago School of architecture. Although not as ornate as most buildings of this style, it does have some ornamental features on its ground floor as well as a cornice topping its third floor. After the phone company stopped having a local walk in customer service center, the street level windows were bricked in.  Today the building is owned by Manatee County and is used for storage.  It is included in a walking tour of downtown Bradenton and is included in the city's master list of historic buildings.

References

Telecommunications buildings in the United States
Chicago school architecture in Florida
Neoclassical architecture in Florida
Buildings and structures completed in 1925
Buildings and structures in Manatee County, Florida
Bradenton, Florida
1925 establishments in Florida